Elaphria basistigma is a moth of the family Noctuidae. It is found on the West Indies.

References

Caradrinini
Moths of the Caribbean
Moths of Cuba
Moths of Guadeloupe
Lepidoptera of Jamaica
Insects of Puerto Rico
Insects of the Dominican Republic
Moths described in 1858